The 1992 United States presidential election in Alabama took place on November 3, 1992, as part of the 1992 United States presidential election. Voters chose nine representatives, or electors to the Electoral College, who voted for president and vice president.

Alabama was won by President George H. W. Bush (R-TX). The presidential contest in Alabama was not a surprise, with Bush winning 47.65% to 40.88% over Arkansas Governor Bill Clinton (D), a margin of 6.77%. Despite the fact that Clinton was a Southern Democrat, Alabama remained a reliably Republican state. The last Democrat to carry Alabama was Jimmy Carter in 1976, who was also a Southern Democrat. Billionaire businessman Ross Perot (I-TX) finished in third, with a disappointing 10.85%.

Black Belt Macon County saw Perot receive his smallest vote share in the nation, and that same county also gave Bush his smallest vote share of any county. By contrast, white suburban Shelby County saw Bush receive 67.97% of the vote, a Republican share exceeded in this three-way election only by the famous past and present bastions of Jackson County, Kentucky, Sioux County, Iowa, and the Texas Panhandle counties of Hansford and Ochiltree.

, this is the last time a Democratic candidate won Lauderdale County, and the last time a Republican won Montgomery County.

Bush's 47.65% of the popular vote was his third-highest vote share in the nation, after Mississippi and South Carolina.

Results

Results by county

See also
United States presidential elections in Alabama

References

Alabama
1992
1992 Alabama elections